Carl Edward "Chucky" Thompson Jr. (July 12, 1968 – August 9, 2021) was an American hip hop and R&B record producer.

Biography
Thompson was born in Washington, D.C., in 1968. He was a member of Bad Boy Entertainment's "Hitmen" team of in-house producers during the 1990s, and worked with Bad Boy mogul Sean Combs on material for artists such as The Notorious B.I.G. and Faith Evans.

His productions included Mary J. Blige's My Life, The Notorious B.I.G.'s Ready to Die and Faith Evans's Faith. Thompson also produced for Nas ("One Mic").

He died of complications from COVID-19 at a hospital in Los Angeles, California, on August 9, 2021.

Production credits
 1994: Usher: "Think of You" from Usher
 1994: Born Jamericans: Kids From Foreign
 1994: The Notorious B.I.G.: "Big Poppa" and "Me & My Bitch" from Ready To Die
 1994: Mary J. Blige: My Life (Nominated for a 1996 Grammy Award for Best R&B Album)
 1995: Total: "No One Else (R&B Mix)"
 1995: Faith Evans: "You Used to Love Me" and "Soon As I Get Home" from Faith
 1995: Mariah Carey & Boyz II Men: "One Sweet Day (Chucky's Remix)"
 1995: Brian McKnight: "On The Down Low (Remix) featuring Paid & Live"
 1996: Puff Johnson: "All Over Your Face (Chucky T's No Rap Remix)"
 1996: Chantay Savage: "Baby Drive Me Crazy" from I Will Survive (Doin' It My Way)
 1996: Soul For Real: "Never Felt This Way" from For Life
 1997: Frankie: My Heart Belongs To You
 1998: Faith Evans & 112: "Caramel Kisses" from Keep the Faith
 1999: Mary J. Blige: "Time" from Mary
 1999: The Notorious B.I.G.: "Can I Get Witcha" from Born Again
 2000: Ice Cube featuring Krayzie Bone:  "Until We Rich" from War & Peace Vol. 2 (The Peace Disc)
 2000: Mýa: "Get Over (Outro)" from Fear Of Flying
 2001: Faith Evans: "Love Song (Outro)" from Faithfully
 2001: Mary J. Blige: "Your Child (Chucky Thompson Late Nite Mix)"
 2001: Nas: One Mic from Stillmatic
 2001: Shyne & Barrington Levy: Bonnie & Shyne from Shyne
 2002: Nas: "U Wanna Be Me" from 8 Mile
 2002: Nas: "Dance" & "Pussy Killz" from God's Son
 2003: Lil' Mo: "Ten Commandments" from Meet the Girl Next Door
 2004: Nas: "No One Else In The Room" featuring Maxwell from Street's Disciple
 2004: Gemma Fox: "Messy"
 2005: Mary J. Blige: "Show Love" from The Breakthrough
 2005: Lil' Mo: "Dem Boyz" from Syndicated: The Lil' Mo Hour
 2006: Shareefa: "No One Said" from Point Of No Return
 2007: Chuck Brown: We're About the Business
 2007: Emily King: East Side Story (Nominated for a 2007 Grammy Award for Best Contemporary R&B Album)
 2007: Sev-One: "War" (Single)
 2007: Raheem DeVaughn: "Woman" (Grammy nominated for 2007 Best R&B Male Performance)
 2009: Ledisi: "Everything Changes", "Trippin'" from Turn Me Loose
 2010: Chuck Brown:We Got This
 2010: Leela James: "Party All Night", "Mr. Incredible Ms. Unforgettable", "Let It Roll" from My Soul
 2010: Faith Evans: "Way You Move", "Worth It", "Your Lover", and "Troubled World", from Something About Faith
 2014: Juvenile: "Tales from the Hood", from The Fundamentals 
 2014: Faith Evans: "I Deserve It", "Fragile", "Ride The Beat (Interlude)" and "Ever Go Away", from Incomparable
 2015: Ne-Yo: "Worth It" from Non-Fiction
 2015: Raheem DeVaughn: "Pretty Lady" and "Queen" from Love Sex Passion
 2015: Busta Rhymes: "Your Loss" from The Return of the Dragon (The Abstract Went On Vacation)
 2016: Fantasia Barrino: "So Blue" (Co-Writer with Rock City and Shareefa) from The Definition Of...
 2017: Faith Evans & The Notorious B.I.G.: "Beautiful (Interlude)", "Fool for You" and "Crazy (Interlude)" from The King & I
 2020: Mary J. Blige: "Can't Be Life" from the soundtrack to the motion picture Body Cam

With Puff Daddy
 1994: Craig Mack: Flava In Ya Ear (Bad Boy Remix- Easy Mo Bee)
 1994: The Notorious B.I.G.: Big Poppa from Ready To Die
 1994: TLC: If I Was Your Girlfriend from CrazySexyCool
 1995: Faith Evans: Ain't Nobody and All This Love  from Faith
 1995: Mary J. Blige: You Bring Me Joy from My Life
 1995: Pebbles: You from Straight From My Heart
 1995: Total: Someone Like You from Total
 1996: Tevin Campbell: I'll Be There from Back To The World
 1996: New Edition: Try Again from Home Again
 1997: Frankie: Think Of You from My Heart Belongs To You
 1998: Faith Evans: My First Love from Keep The Faith
 1999: The Notorious B.I.G.: Dead Wrong

References

External links
 Chucky Thompson Photo Gallery
   Le groupe SoulRnB.com consacré à Chucky Thompson
 Chucky Thompson at Beatbuggy
 
 

1968 births
2021 deaths
African-American record producers
Hip hop record producers
Record producers from Washington, D.C.
Deaths from the COVID-19 pandemic in California
21st-century African-American people